Coris District is one of 5 districts in the Aija Province, of the Ancash Region in Peru. Its population was 1639 as of the 2017 census.

References

Districts of the Aija Province
Districts of the Ancash Region